Chuck Damschen (born March 27, 1955) is an American politician. He is a member of the North Dakota House of Representatives from the 10th District, serving since 2004. He is a member of the Republican party.

References

1955 births
Living people
People from Devils Lake, North Dakota
Republican Party members of the North Dakota House of Representatives
21st-century American politicians